Vystavka is the name of several  rural localities in Russia.

Arkhangelsk Oblast
As of 2010, three rural localities in Arkhangelsk Oblast bear this name:
Vystavka, Pacheozersky Selsoviet, Kotlassky District, Arkhangelsk Oblast, a village in Pacheozersky Selsoviet of Kotlassky District
Vystavka, Votlazhemsky Selsoviet, Kotlassky District, Arkhangelsk Oblast, a village in Votlazhemsky Selsoviet of Kotlassky District
Vystavka, Privodino, Kotlassky District, Arkhangelsk Oblast, a village under the administrative jurisdiction of Privodino Urban-Type Settlement with Jurisdictional Territory in Kotlassky District
Vystavka, Cheremushskoye Rural Settlement, Kotlassky District, Arkhangelsk Oblast, a village in Cheremushskoye Rural Settlement of Kotlassky District

Ivanovo Oblast
As of 2010, two rural localities in Ivanovo Oblast bear this name:
Vystavka (Ramenskoye Rural Settlement), Palekhsky District, Ivanovo Oblast, a village in Palekhsky District; municipally, a part of Ramenskoye Rural Settlement of that district
Vystavka (Panovskoye Rural Settlement), Palekhsky District, Ivanovo Oblast, a village in Palekhsky District; municipally, a part of Panovskoye Rural Settlement of that district

Kostroma Oblast
As of 2010, one rural locality in Kostroma Oblast bears this name:
Vystavka, Kostroma Oblast, a village in Belkovskoye Settlement of Vokhomsky District

Novgorod Oblast
As of 2010, five rural localities in Novgorod Oblast bear this name:
Vystavka, Sushilovskoye Settlement, Borovichsky District, Novgorod Oblast, a village in Sushilovskoye Settlement of Borovichsky District
Vystavka, Zhelezkovskoye Settlement, Borovichsky District, Novgorod Oblast, a village in Zhelezkovskoye Settlement of Borovichsky District
Vystavka, Kholmsky District, Novgorod Oblast, a village in Togodskoye Settlement of Kholmsky District
Vystavka, Malovishersky District, Novgorod Oblast, a village in Burginskoye Settlement of Malovishersky District
Vystavka, Moshenskoy District, Novgorod Oblast, a village in Dolgovskoye Settlement of Moshenskoy District

Pskov Oblast
As of 2010, five rural localities in Pskov Oblast bear this name:
Vystavka, Ostrovsky District, Pskov Oblast, a village in Ostrovsky District
Vystavka, Palkinsky District, Pskov Oblast, a village in Palkinsky District
Vystavka, Pechorsky District, Pskov Oblast, a village in Pechorsky District
Vystavka, Porkhovsky District, Pskov Oblast, a village in Porkhovsky District
Vystavka, Pskovsky District, Pskov Oblast, a village in Pskovsky District

Smolensk Oblast
As of 2010, one rural locality in Smolensk Oblast bears this name:
Vystavka, Smolensk Oblast, a village in Vorobyevskoye Rural Settlement of Demidovsky District

Tver Oblast
As of 2010, two rural localities in Tver Oblast bear this name:
Vystavka, Likhoslavlsky District, Tver Oblast, a village in Stanskoye Rural Settlement of Likhoslavlsky District
Vystavka, Selizharovsky District, Tver Oblast, a village in Berezugskoye Rural Settlement of Selizharovsky District

Vologda Oblast
As of 2010, one rural locality in Vologda Oblast bears this name:
Vystavka, Vologda Oblast, a village in Verkhneshardengsky Selsoviet of Velikoustyugsky District